Ya'ad (lit. Destiny or Goal) is a small moshav in northern Israel. Located near the city of Karmiel, it falls under the jurisdiction of Misgav Regional Council.

History
It was founded in 1974 by computer science graduates from the Technion next to the land where the Arab village of Mi'ar existed until 1947 and the independence of Israel

References

External links
Official website

Moshavim
Populated places in Northern District (Israel)
Populated places established in 1974
1974 establishments in Israel